Chanchalguda Central Jail, located in Hyderabad, India, is one of the oldest jails in the country. The jail is in the old city of Hyderabad at Chanchalguda. It was constructed during the regime of the Nizam of Hyderabad by chief architect Nawab Khan Bahadur Mirza Akbar Baig, and remains operational today.  

The jail has an official capacity of 1000 inmates, but has recently come to exceed 1600 inmates and is said to be overcrowded. An average of 40 new inmates arrive at the jail daily. In 2012, renovations began to update the amenities and expand the occupancy of the jail. Following the introduction of an adult literacy program, Chanchalguda Central Jail reported a 100% literacy rate from 1989-90.

References

Prisons in Hyderabad, India
1879 establishments in India